HTTR may refer to:

 High-temperature engineering test reactor
 Hail to the Redskins